Hiester Clymer (November 3, 1827 – June 12, 1884) was an American political leader from the state of Pennsylvania. Clymer was a member of the Hiester family political dynasty and the Democratic Party. He was the nephew of William Muhlenberg Hiester and the cousin of Isaac Ellmaker Hiester. Although Clymer was born in Pennsylvania, he was adamantly opposed to Abraham Lincoln's administration and the Republican Party's prosecution of the American Civil War. Elected Pennsylvania state senator in 1860, Clymer opposed state legislation that supported the state Republican Party's war effort. After the American Civil War ended, Clymer unsuccessfully ran for the Pennsylvania Governor's office in 1866 on a white supremacist platform against Union Major-General John W. Geary. After his election to the U.S. House of Representatives in 1872 as a Democrat, Clymer would be primarily known for his investigation of Sec. William W. Belknap's War Department in 1876. Belknap escaped conviction in a Senate impeachment trial, and had resigned his cabinet position before being impeached by the House of Representatives. Having retired from the House in 1881, Clymer served as Vice President of the Union Trust Co. of Philadelphia and president of the Clymer Iron Co. until his death in 1884.

Early life
Clymer was born near Morgantown, Pennsylvania. He attended Princeton University, studied law, and was admitted to the bar in 1849.  Clymer practiced law in Berks County and Schuylkill County, Pennsylvania.  His brother, Edward M. Clymer, married the actress and poet, Ella Maria Dietz.

Political career

He was a delegate to the national conventions of the Democratic Party in 1860 and 1868. He served in the Pennsylvania State Senate for the 8th district from 1861 to 1866. He ran unsuccessfully for Governor of Pennsylvania in 1866 on a white supremacist policy, losing to John W. Geary. In the controversial campaign, Clymer's camp produced some of the most virulently graphic racist posters and pamphlets of the decade.

U.S. Representative (1873–1881)
He was elected to the House of Representatives in 1872 and served from March 4, 1873 to March 3, 1881.  While in Congress, he served on the Committee on Appropriations and the Committee on Expenditures in the Department of State, and as chairman of the Committee on Expenditures in the Department of War.

Retirement and death
After he left Congress, he served as vice president of the Union Trust Company in Philadelphia and as president of the Clymer Iron Company. He died in Reading, Pennsylvania, on June 12, 1884, by suicide as a result of what one newspaper account called "financial embarrassment." He is interred at the Charles Evans Cemetery.

Further reading

The Political Graveyard

References

External links
 

|-

1827 births
1884 deaths
19th-century American politicians
American white supremacists
Burials at Charles Evans Cemetery
Democratic Party members of the United States House of Representatives from Pennsylvania

Hiester family
Democratic Party Pennsylvania state senators
People from Berks County, Pennsylvania
People from Schuylkill County, Pennsylvania
Princeton University alumni